Period of Adjustment is a 1960 play by Tennessee Williams that was adapted in the film version of 1962.

Both the stage and film versions are set on Christmas Eve and tell the gentle, light-hearted story of two couples, one newlywed and the other married for five years, both experiencing pains and difficulties in their relationships. The two male characters are veterans of the Korean War. The younger of the two experiences post traumatic stress (shellshock, battle fatigue, combat stress reaction), and the older man suffers from feelings of inadequacy towards his wife, the daughter of his boss. However, the observance of each other’s troubles brings both couples to realize what they have and to reconcile their own relationships.

Williams wrote the first draft of the play in November 1958 "in a rush of activity partly induced by drugs." It was workshopped for a week in December 1958 and officially premiered at the Helen Hayes Theatre on Broadway on November 10, 1960. It was directed by George Roy Hill, the stage settings and lighting were by Jo Mielziner, the costumes were by Patricia Zipprodt, and the production stage manager was William Chambers. The play, which Williams subtitled "a serious comedy," was a departure from the playwright's usual dark dramas, and was written partly in response to a Hollywood columnist who had asked why his plays were always "plunging into the sewers." Williams responded to the criticism by writing Period of Adjustment and arguing, in a piece that was published  in The New York Times,

The play received average reviews and closed March 4, 1961 after 132 performances. The original cast was:
 James Daly as Ralph Bates
 Barbara Baxley as Isabel Haverstick 
 Robert Webber as George Haverstick 
 Helen Martin as Susie 
 Esther Benson as Lady Caroler

In February 2006, the play was revived at the Almeida Theatre in London.

Footnotes

References

External links 

 

1960 plays
American plays adapted into films
Plays by Tennessee Williams
Plays set in the United States
Southern United States in fiction
Christmas plays
New Directions Publishing books